Râncăciov may refer to several places in Romania:

 Râncăciov, a village in Călinești Commune, Argeș County
 Râncăciov, a village in Dragomirești Commune, Dâmbovița County
 Râncăciov (river), a tributary of the Argeș in Argeș County